The 72nd Regiment of Foot was a regiment in the British Army from 1758 to 1763.

It was formed on 28 April 1758 from the 2nd Battalion of the 33rd Regiment of Foot and took part in the Raid on Cherbourg in 1758 and the capture of Belle Isle in 1761. After further service in Cuba the regiment was disbanded in 1763.

Regimental Colonels

 1758–1763: F.M. Charles Lennox, 3rd Duke of Richmond, KG

Notable members

 Robert Prescott, who later became governor general of Canada, served as the regiment's lieutenant-colonel in 1762

References

Infantry regiments of the British Army
Military units and formations established in 1758
Military units and formations disestablished in 1763
1758 establishments in England